Bad Habits is a 2007 Mexican drama film directed by Simón Bross.

Cast 
 Ximena Ayala - Matilde
 Elena de Haro - Elena
 Marco Treviño - Gustavo
 Aurora Cano - Teresa
 Elisa Vicedo - Linda
 Emilio Echevarría - Ramón - padre de Matilde
 Patricia Reyes Spíndola - Madre Superiora
 Milagros Vidal - Gordibuena
 Héctor Téllez - Sacerdote
 Alejandro Calva - Doctor Sensato
 Leticia Gómez - Monja

References

External links 

2007 drama films
2007 films
Mexican drama films
2000s Mexican films